Adam Varadi (born 30 April 1985) is a Czech football player who currently plays for MFK Frýdek-Místek.

Varadi was a member of the squad of Baník Ostrava in the 2003-2004 season, when Baník won the league title. He played for the Czech Republic youth national teams since the under-15 level.

Honours 
SK Sigma Olomouc
 Czech Cup: 2011–12

References

External links
 
 
 
 

Czech footballers
Czech Republic youth international footballers
Czech Republic under-21 international footballers
Czech First League players
FC Baník Ostrava players
FC Viktoria Plzeň players
FK Viktoria Žižkov players
FK Teplice players
SK Sigma Olomouc players
FK Senica players
Expatriate footballers in Slovakia
Expatriate footballers in Poland
1985 births
Living people
People from Frýdek-Místek
Association football forwards
SK Dynamo České Budějovice players
GKS Tychy players
Polonia Bytom players
FK Frýdek-Místek players
Sportspeople from the Moravian-Silesian Region